Kulichappattu is a village in the Thanjavur taluk of Thanjavur district, Tamil Nadu, India.

Demographics 

As per the 2001 census, Kulichapattu had a total population of 1774 with 860 males and 914 females. The sex ratio was 1063. The literacy rate was 66.12.

Location 
Located in south east direction of Thanjavur town about 10 km away. Nearby town is Mariamman Kovil (Punnainallur), around 4 km.
Kulichapattu is situated between NH67 and SH63. Can be reached in 10 minutes by bike/car from PRIST University east campus. Sameway can be reached in 10–15 minutes by bike/car from Mariamman Kovil.

External links 
Kulichapattu in Tamil Wikipedia

References 

 

Villages in Thanjavur district